Bailing is the process of removing water from a vessel.

Hand bailers
A hand bailer is a device used for manually removing water which has entered a vessel. In the simplest case, it is merely a smaller container which can be filled and then emptied. This kind of device has been in use since early times. It is still in use on small boats and rafts, though some are self-bailing. Some regulations require either or both forms of bailing.

Self bailers
For some modern types of dinghys in sailing sports hand bailers can be obsolete when they are equipped with self bailers, sometimes also called automatic bailers. Self-bailing boats are shaped so that they will drain completely if filled with water; powered by the venturi effect and the motion of the boat, they are distinct from the powered bilge pumps used on non-self-bailing boats.

References

See also 
Bailer (hydrogeology)

Safety equipment
Water sports equipment
Fishing equipment